The National Basketball League Most Outstanding Kiwi Forward/Centre is an annual National Basketball League (NBL) award given since the 1985 New Zealand NBL season to the best performing New Zealand player of the regular season who is classified as a small forward, power forward or centre. The majority of recipients are power forwards who can also play centre when required. Notable small forwards to have won the award include Terrence Lewis (2001), Thomas Abercrombie (2009 & 2010) and Duane Bailey (2014). The winner of the award receives the Stan Hill Trophy, which is named in honour of Hill, a former NBL player and coach who represented the New Zealand men's national basketball team during the 1970s and 1980s. Hill also won the league's inaugural Most Outstanding Forward Award in 1982.

Winners

See also
 List of National Basketball League (New Zealand) awards

References

Awards established in 1985
Kiwi
F
1985 establishments in New Zealand